Aulidiotis phoxopterella is a species of moth in the family Gelechiidae. It was described by Snellen in 1903. It is found in Indonesia (Java) and India.

The wingspan is about 19 mm for males and 16 mm females. The forewings are shining greyish-brown, but yellowish in the middle. The hindwings are dirty white.

References

Gelechiinae
Moths described in 1903
Moths of Indonesia
Moths of Asia